Artie William Parks  (November 1, 1911 – December 6, 1989) was an outfielder in Major League Baseball. He played for the Brooklyn Dodgers during the 1937 and 1939 baseball seasons.

References

External links

Major League Baseball outfielders
Brooklyn Dodgers players
Baseball players from Arkansas
1911 births
1989 deaths
Sioux City Cowboys players
Oklahoma City Indians players
Nashville Vols players
Jackson Mississippians players
Allentown Brooks players
Jackson Senators players
Elmira Colonels players
Montreal Royals players
Louisville Colonels (minor league) players
Indianapolis Indians players
Little Rock Travelers players